Port of Bitung is a seaport located in Bitung, North Sulawesi, Indonesia. It is the largest port in the province, consists of both container and passenger ship ports. The port serves as a hub for most exports originated from North Sulawesi and other areas of eastern Indonesia to destinations such as Philippines and Vietnam. There are also ferry routes linking Bitung with General Santos and Davao City.

Facilities 
Since Bitung Harbor's designation as an important international hub seaport in 2012, it has a larger sets of facilities than other ports in the area. currently Bitung Harbor has 4 wharvies:

 Ocean Wharf, 607 meters long with a depth of about 5 meters.
 Nusantara Wharf, 652 meters long with a depth of about 6 meters.
 Container Wharf VIII, 182 meters long with a depth of about 20 meters.
 Container Wharf IX, 60 meters long with a depth of about 10 meters.

In addition, there are other facilities that support the operation of the port, namely a container crane, a mobile crane, 4 chassis, 5 trucks, 5 forklifts, water desalination facility, refueling stop, dry wharf for repairment, warehouse and a medical facility.

References 

Bitung
B
B